Antonius Montfoort (26 September 1902 – 29 April 1974) was a Dutch fencer. He competed in the individual and team sabre events at the 1936 Summer Olympics.

References

External links
 

1902 births
1974 deaths
Dutch male sabre fencers
Olympic fencers of the Netherlands
Fencers at the 1936 Summer Olympics
Sportspeople from The Hague
20th-century Dutch people